Francis Mostyn (6 August 1860 – 25 October 1939) was a Welsh prelate of the Catholic Church who served as the Archbishop of Cardiff from 1921 until his death in 1939.

Biography
Francis Edward Joseph Mostyn was born in Talacre, Flintshire, Wales, the fourth son of Sir Pyers Mostyn, 8th Baronet (1811–1882; see Mostyn Baronets) and Frances Georgina (née Fraser; died 1899), a daughter of the 12th Lord Lovat. He was ordained to the priesthood on 14 September 1884. On 4 July 1895, he was appointed the first Vicar Apostolic of Wales and Titular Bishop of Ascalon by Pope Leo XIII.

Mostyn received his episcopal consecration on the following 14 September 1895 (the ninth anniversary of his priestly ordination) from Cardinal Herbert Vaughan, with Bishops John Carroll and John Hedley, OSB, serving as co-consecrators. He was later named Bishop of Menevia upon his vicariate's elevation to a diocese on 14 May 1898. On 7 March 1921, Mostyn was appointed Archbishop of Cardiff by Pope Benedict XV, leading the only archdiocese in Wales.

Death
Archbishop Mostyn died in office in October 1939, aged 79, having served as archbishop for eighteen years.

References

External links
Genealogy of Francis Edward Mostyn

1860 births
1939 deaths
19th-century Roman Catholic bishops in Wales
20th-century Roman Catholic bishops in Wales
20th-century Roman Catholic archbishops in the United Kingdom
Roman Catholic archbishops of Cardiff
Apostolic vicars of England and Wales
Roman Catholic bishops of Menevia
Place of birth missing
Place of death missing
Welsh bishops